Horton is an unincorporated community in northern Vernon County, Missouri, United States. It is located on U.S. 71, approximately eight miles north of Nevada.

History
Horton most likely had its start when the railroad was extended to that point. The community was named in 1890, most likely after a railroad man. A post office was established at Horton in 1891, and remained in operation until 1996.

Notes

Unincorporated communities in Vernon County, Missouri
Unincorporated communities in Missouri